Luis Hartwig (born 23 November 2002) is a German professional footballer who plays as a centre-forward for 2. Liga club St. Pölten on loan from VfL Bochum.

Career
Hartwig made his professional debut for VfL Bochum in the 2. Bundesliga on 24 January 2021, coming on as a substitute in the 83rd minute for Simon Zoller against SV Sandhausen. The away match finished as a 1–1 draw.

For the 2022–23 season, Hartwig was loaned to SKN St. Pölten in Austria.

Personal life
Hartwig's father, Knut, was also a professional footballer who played in the 2. Bundesliga for Wuppertal.

Career statistics

References

External links
 
 
 
 

2002 births
Living people
German footballers
Association football forwards
Germany youth international footballers
VfL Bochum players
SKN St. Pölten players
Bundesliga players
2. Bundesliga players
2. Liga (Austria) players
German expatriate footballers
Expatriate footballers in Austria
German expatriate sportspeople in Austria